Wilco's More Like the Moon EP (also called Bridge and Australian EP) was originally released as a bonus disc to the Australian version of Yankee Hotel Foxtrot. The band ended up releasing the EP via the band's website in 2003 to any who had bought Yankee Hotel Foxtrot. The EP features an alternate version of "Kamera", four previously unreleased songs, and an earlier take of "Handshake Drugs", a song that was retooled for A Ghost Is Born.

Track listing
All songs written by Wilco.

"Camera"  – 3:44
"Handshake Drugs"  – 5:11
"Woodgrain"  – 1:42
"A Magazine Called Sunset"  – 2:39
"Bob Dylan's 49th Beard"  – 2:20
"More Like the Moon"  – 6:07

References 

2003 EPs
Albums free for download by copyright owner
Wilco EPs
Nonesuch Records EPs
Albums produced by Jeff Tweedy